Busch Campus is one of the five sub-campuses at Rutgers University's New Brunswick/Piscataway area campus, and is located entirely within Piscataway, New Jersey, US. Academic facilities and departments centered on this campus are primarily those related to the natural sciences: physics, pharmacy, engineering, psychology, mathematics and statistics, chemistry, geology, and biology. The Rutgers Medical School was also built on this campus in 1970, but a year later was separated by the state, renamed the Robert Wood Johnson Medical School, and merge with the New Jersey Medical School and other health profession schools in Newark and New Brunswick to create the College of Medicine and Dentistry of New Jersey. Rutgers and the medical school continued to share the land and facilities on the campus in a slightly irregular arrangement. On July 1, 2013, Robert Wood Johnson Medical School was officially merged back into Rutgers University, along with most of the other schools of UMDNJ, with the exception of the UMDNJ-School of Osteopathic Medicine.

The campus is named after Charles L. Busch (1902–1971), of Edgewater, New Jersey, an eccentric millionaire, who unexpectedly donated $10 million to the University for biological research at his death in 1971. The campus was formerly known as "University Heights Campus". The land was donated by the state in the 1930s, and a stadium was constructed. The land was formerly a country club, and the original golf course still exists on the campus.

Selected buildings
Waksman Institute of Microbiology is a research facility on the Busch Campus of Rutgers University. It is named after Selman Waksman, who was a faculty member who won the Nobel Prize for Medicine in 1952 for research which led to the discovery of streptomycin. 18 antibiotics were isolated in Waksman's laboratory. Streptomycin and neomycin, and actinomycin, were commercialized.
Center for Advanced Biotechnology and Medicine (CABM) was established in 1985 to advance knowledge in the life sciences for the improvement of human health. It is jointly administered by the University of Medicine and Dentistry of New Jersey and by Rutgers, The State University of New Jersey. The building was completed in 1990, and has  of lab and office space.
Hill Center for the Mathematical Sciences, named for George William Hill (Rutgers 1859), opened in 1971 and houses the Mathematics and Computer Science departments, along with a number of small centers. It also houses the Mathematical Sciences Library and a large underground data center.
William Levine Hall houses the Ernest Mario School of Pharmacy.
The Library of Science and Medicine is the main library for science and health collection of the Rutgers University Libraries system.
The School of Engineering. The original four-wing building was opened in 1963.
Richard Weeks Hall of Engineering is home to the Department of Civil and Environmental Engineering as well as various interdisciplinary and multi-use labs and classrooms.
The Busch Campus Center and Busch Dining Hall
Paul Robeson Cultural Center
Administrative Services building I and two annex buildings
Archive building for the University Library system
Many residence halls and apartment buildings for undergraduate and graduate students
SHI Stadium and Hale Center
Yurcak field for lacrosse and soccer
Sonny Werblin Recreation Center
University President's compound
Physics facilities
Classroom buildings: SERC and ARC
University of Medicine and Dentistry buildings
Busch Campus Heat/Electricity Cogeneration plant

References

Rutgers University
Rutgers University Busch Campus
Piscataway, New Jersey
Rutgers University buildings